The Voss Literary Prize is an annual award named in honour of historian Vivian Robert de Vaux Voss (1930–1963). It is awarded to the best novel published in the previous year and is managed and judged by the Australian University Heads of English. The award was originally conceived by Voss in 1955, two years before publication of Patrick White's Voss and is funded from his estate.

Award winners

References

External links 
 Official website

Australian literary awards
Awards established in 2014
Australian literature-related lists